Dasan Pass or Sanguan Pass is a mountain pass located west mountain area of the city of Baoji in Shaanxi province.

It was a military mountain gate guarding the Guanzhong Plain since Zhou Dynasty. Because of its strategic location, more than 70 battles had been fought here throughout Chinese history. In year 1131, Song Dynasty generals Wu Jie and Wu Lin brothers were stationed here against Jin general Wanyan Wulu.

Mountain passes of China